The Justice Sonia Sotomayor Houses and Community Center is a housing project in Soundview, The Bronx, New York City. Formerly known as the Bronxdale Houses, the project was renamed in honor of Supreme Court Justice Sonia Sotomayor, who had spent part of her childhood in the development, in June 2010. The complex was originally opened in January 1955.  The 28-building complex includes close to 1,500 apartments that house about 3,500 residents. The 30.77-acre development is bordered by Bruckner Boulevard and Watson, Soundview and Leland Avenues.

Notable people 

 Andre Harrell (born 1960), rapper and music executive 
 Sonia Sotomayor (born 1954), Supreme Court Justice

See also
New York City Housing Authority
List of New York City Housing Authority properties

References

Public housing in the Bronx
Residential buildings in the Bronx
Soundview, Bronx